The Étang du Méjean, the "pond of Méjean" (sometimes called Étang de Pérols in its eastern part) is part of the lagoon complex of the Palavas ponds (Étangs palavasiens). It is located in the Hérault department, in southern France, on the Mediterranean coast.

See also
 Étang de l'Or

External links

  Siel website, Syndicat Mixte des étangs littoraux
  Lagoon watch in Languedoc-Roussillon

Lakes of Hérault